The Strawberry Alarm Clock is a morning radio programme on FM104, an  Independent Local Radio station in Dublin. It broadcasts weekday mornings from 6-10am, with "Best Of The Strawberry Alarm Clock" Saturdays from 9am-12pm. The show podcasts weekly through www.fm104.ie

History
The show began in 1995, and was originally presented by Timmy Ryan, Justin McKenna, Conor Mahoney and Joan Lea. Colm Hayes took over from Timmy Ryan in 1996, and the show quickly became a success. In 2000, Justin McKenna left the radio business while Joan Lea moved to drivetime programme "The Jam". Jim Nugent joined Colm and they became known as the duo "Colm & Jim-Jim". During this time they were joined by various female presenters including Niamh Crowley, Edel Daly, Taragh Loughry Grant and Sandra Mason, however Colm and Jim left FM104 on 12 January 2007 and moved to RTÉ 2fm where they presented 2FM's morning show The Colm & Jim-Jim Breakfast Show. Andy Matthews took over the show on an interim basis on 15 January 2007, however he was replaced by the new team of Jim McCabe and Niamh Crowley from 13 February 2007.

On 13 September 2010, Jim-Jim Nugent returned to FM104 to replace Jim McCabe & Niamh Crowley who were let go due to poor ratings. FM104 launched a major outdoor and television campaign titled "Jim-Jim's Back". Jim-Jim is now joined by Mark Noble, the former presenter of drive time show The Jam.

Over the years, the show has created numerous parody songs which have become instant hits, most notably "Sexy Joe" (Sexy Back), "Pyjamaaaa" (Pjanoo) and "I Hate Henry" (Take On Me). There have also been numerous sports songs to celebrate rugby, football and GAA games.

Previous television adverts for the show features a young man running naked through the streets of Dublin, as if he was in a dream, confirmed by the catchphrase at the end "You haven't woken up until you`ve woken up to The Strawberry Alarm Clock, on FM104!!"

Features on the show
Kids In The Car

Each morning at 8.40, Jim-Jim & Mark chat to a kid in a car on their way to school. They then must try guess what the kid is thinking about in 20 seconds. If they fail, the kid shouts the catchphrase "Ha Ha, In Your Face Suckers"

Pop Life

This is a music quiz on Friday mornings. A listener comes on air to compete against either Jim-Jim or Mark. The quiz involves identifying clips of music played in reverse.

Uncovered Unplugged

Uncovered Unplugged is the live music segment. This usually happens after 9am when a band or artist come into studio, performing one original track and one cover version. As part of FM104's "Help A Dublin Child" appeal, a charity CD was released in November 2007 featuring the best Uncovered Unplugged tracks of the year. This CD reached number two in the Irish compilation charts.

Gavin

Gavin Highlife chats to Jim-Jim & Mark weekly. A posh, rugby loving, south Dublin man, Gavin is not shy in telling listeners his real feelings on issues such as Scooter Scum, Dublin 1, and Boggers.

References

 Bell tolls for 2FM breakfast show name - Irish, Business - Independent.ie
 Can the Strawberry Alarm Clock team wake up 2FM? - Business - Independent.ie
 No Strawberry reunion for Colm and Jim Jim - Lifestyle - Independent.ie
 'Alarmed' RTE radio axes Marty's show - National News - Independent.ie

Further reading

External links
 FM 104 website
  Strawberry Alarm Clock Page
  Strawberry Alarm Clock Blog
  Strawberry Alarm Clock TV Ad

Irish breakfast radio shows